Dytiscus habilis is a species of predaceous diving beetle in the family Dytiscidae. It is found in North America from Oklahoma to Arizona south throughout Mexico to Guatemala; it is the only Dytiscus species found in the Neotropics.

References

Further reading

 

Dytiscidae
Beetles of Central America
Beetles of North America
Taxa named by Thomas Say
Beetles described in 1830
Articles created by Qbugbot